The Sun, The Moon and The Truth is a Burmese legal drama television series. It aired on MRTV for 18 episodes. Season 1 aired from February 13, to April 3, 2015, on every Friday at 21:30 for 8 episodes  and season 2 aired from September 5 to 26, 2018, on every Wednesday, Thursday and Friday at 19:15 for 10 episodes.

Cast
Su Pan Htwar as May Hnin Si
Moe Yan Zun as Sai Thura
Nay Yan as Htun Naing
Phone Thike as Nay Min Htet
Khin Zarchi Kyaw as Khin Khin
Nyi Nanda as Khine Htoo San

References

Burmese television series
MRTV (TV network) original programming